The term Lebanon War can refer to any of the following wars, fought in Lebanon:
Lebanese Civil War (1975–1990)
Hundred Days' War 1978 (part of the Lebanese Civil War)
1982 Lebanon War (part of the Lebanese Civil War, also known as the First Lebanon War)
Mountain War (Lebanon) 1983–1984 (part of the Lebanese Civil War)
War of the Camps 1984–1989 (part of the Lebanese Civil War)
South Lebanon conflict (1985–2000)
2006 Lebanon War (also known as the Second Lebanon War)
2007 Lebanon conflict 
2008 conflict in Lebanon
Syrian Civil War spillover in Lebanon

See also
1860 civil conflict in Mount Lebanon and Damascus